Fredrik Wilhelm Löwenadler (12 September 1895 – 3 September 1967) was a Swedish swimmer. He competed at the 1912 Summer Olympics in the 200 m breaststroke event, but failed to reach the final.

References

1895 births
1967 deaths
Olympic swimmers of Sweden
Swimmers at the 1912 Summer Olympics
Swedish male breaststroke swimmers
Swimmers from Gothenburg